Stara Łubianka  is a village in the administrative district of Gmina Szydłowo, within Piła County, Greater Poland Voivodeship, in west-central Poland.

The village has a population of 1,300.

References

External links
 Website about Landkreis Deutsch Krone with information about the cities and villages (in German / deutsch)

Villages in Piła County